George William Veditz (August 13, 1861 – March 12, 1937) was a former president of National Association of the Deaf of the United States and one of the first people to film American Sign Language.

Life

Early life
Veditz was born to German immigrant parents and was enrolled in Zion School in Baltimore, a bilingual school, at age five. He became fluent in both German and English before losing his hearing at age 8 due to scarlet fever. After initially being educated by a private instructor, he entered the Maryland School for the Deaf in 1875. Following his graduation, he attended Gallaudet College, where he studied to be a teacher. During Veditz's time as a student, the college was known as the "National Deaf-Mute College" at the Columbia Institution for the Deaf. In 1893, it was renamed Gallaudet College, then later became Gallaudet University in 1986.

Career as a teacher
Following his graduation from Gallaudet in 1884, Veditz began to work as a teacher at the Maryland School for the Deaf. The next year, in 1885, he accepted a new position at the Colorado School for the Deaf, where he worked as a teacher for seventeen years. While in Colorado, he maintained his ties with his alma mater in Maryland, serving as a leader of its alumni association, and providing the foundation for what would become the Maryland Association of the Deaf.

President of National Association of the Deaf

In 1904, Veditz was elected president of the National Association of the Deaf of the United States (NAD) and was re-elected in 1907. Its greatest preoccupation was the preservation of sign language, which he saw as being threatened by the advancement of the oralist proposals in schools. During this time, cinema gained popularity, and Veditz dedicated the NAD to gather money to finance recordings of speeches in sign language.

The project , which began in 1910, aimed to film the masterful uses of sign language. One of the people recorded was the then-director of Gallaudet, Edward Miner Gallaudet. The shootings of the NAD were the first registry done of sign languages in the world, and are considered a valuable document of Deaf history. In the film, Veditz makes an enthusiastic defence of the right of the Deaf people to use sign language and talks of its beauty, as well as its value to humanity. The Library of Congress announced on December 28, 2011, that it had named the landmark 1913 film, The Preservation of the Sign Language, for inclusion in the National Film Registry.

In August 1913, Veditz conveyed the sentiments of US President Woodrow Wilson to the people attending the tenth NAD convention in Cleveland, Ohio, translating from a note that President Wilson had handwritten and had delivered to Veditz.

Death
Veditz died on 12th March 1937, when he was 75 years old in Colorado.

ASL festival
Since 1997, Veditz has been remembered by the George Veditz ASL Festival, dedicated to celebrate the wealth of sign language with literary poetry and stories.

Deaf Cultural Digital Library

The Deaf Cultural Digital Library (DCDL) Law has been passed and signed by the governor of Maryland in May 2014, the first of its kind in the US. The law comes under the Department of Education and is managed by the State of Maryland Librarian and the DCDL Coordinator. The DCDL Advisory Committee has been established in spring 2016. Friends of DCDL group has begun in November 2016. The Montgomery County Public Library can show how to join and support the DCDL.

Biographical information from the public domain

A man of pleasing address, courtly in manners and giving outward evidence of being scholarly in his tastes and inclinations—such is George W. Veditz, the distinguished teacher and writer whose name is well known among the deaf and educators of the deaf. A master of several languages, German and French especially, his contributions to the National Exponent from 1894 to 1896, during which he was foreign editor, were of special value and highly appreciated. He has been more or less identified with literary work since he left school, first as editor of the Maryland Bulletin for four years, and later as editor of the Colorado Index for a like number of years. As a teacher he is painstaking and thorough, and commands the respect and confidence of his pupils to an unusual degree.

Mr. Veditz became deaf when eight years old, previous to which time he had attended a German-English private school three years. For two years after his loss of hearing he had a private tutor, after which he was sent to the Maryland School for the Deaf, in 1875. He was a pupil of that school five years, leaving to enter Gallaudet college in 1880. While attending the Maryland school he was private secretary to the principal for four years. He also acted as foreman of the printing office of the same school for two years. When he reached Gallaudet college he was able to at once enter the freshman class, and he pursued his studies there for four years, with great success, and graduated in 1884, being valedictorian of his class. He was immediately appointed a teacher in the Maryland School for the Deaf, where he taught for four years. In 1888 he resigned his position to accept a teacher-ship in the Colorado School for the Deaf, where he is to the present day.

He was at one time chairman of the executive committee of the National Deaf-Mute Association, and is at present first vice-president of that body. He is a lover of chess and played a matrimonial chess game so well in 1894 that he won for his bride Miss Mary Elizabeth Bigler, of Revolutionary ancestry, one of whose great-grandfathers was a colonel on Washington's staff. She is also a grandniece of John Bigler, the first governor of California, and of William Bigler, at one time governor of Pennsylvania and United States senator from that state.

(From the book: "Representative Deaf Persons of the United States of America," ed. by James E. Gallager, 1898.)

Quotations
 "As long as we have deaf people on earth, we will have signs. And as long as we have our films, we can preserve signs in their old purity. It is my hope that we will all love and guard our beautiful sign language as the noblest gift God has given to deaf people."—George Veditz, 1913.

See also
 Writings By George W. Veditz
 Gallaudet University
 Colorado Association for the Deaf's history of George Veditz
 Translating Veditz
 Translation of Veditz's speech--The Preservation of the Sign Language"

References

External links

 The Preservation of Sign Language
 Gallaudet Alumni Cards
 National Association of the Deaf's website
   George Veditz address at Gallaudet on Presentation Day, 1884

1861 births
1937 deaths
Educators of the deaf
Gallaudet University alumni
Articles containing video clips
People involved with sign language